Michaela Goade (born 1989 or 1990) is an American illustrator. A member of the Tlingit and Haida tribes, she is known for her work on picture books about Indigenous people. She won the 2021 Caldecott Medal for her illustrations in We Are Water Protectors and is the first Indigenous artist to receive the award.  Her book, Berry Song was a Caldecott Honor book in 2023.

Early life and education 
Goade was born in Juneau, Alaska, in 1989 or 1990. She is a member of the Tlingit and Haida tribes of Alaska and the Kiks.ádi clan of Sitka. Goade attended Fort Lewis College in Durango, Colorado, where she received a bachelor's degree in graphic design and marketing in 2014.

Career 
After graduating from college, Goade became an art director for Yuit Communications in Anchorage where she worked for two years while also working as a freelance artist.  She later quit her job and moved back to Juneau to illustrate picture books for the Sealaska Heritage Institute's Baby Raven Reads series, beginning with Shanyaak'utlaax: Salmon Boy (2017), for which she won the 2018 American Indian Youth Literature Award for Best Picture Book. In 2019, she illustrated the picture book Encounter, written by Brittany Luby. David Treuer of The New York Times wrote that Goade's illustrations for the book were "gorgeous and achingly rendered", and a reviewer for Shelf Awareness praised the varying perspectives of her mixed-media illustrations.

Her next work was We Are Water Protectors, written by Carole Lindstrom and published by Roaring Brook Press in 2020. The book was written in response to the Dakota Access Pipeline protests at Standing Rock, and Goade worked on the watercolor illustrations in 2018 over a period of three to four months. She received the 2021 Caldecott Medal for her illustrations, becoming the first Indigenous artist and first woman of color to win the award. In a review for The Horn Book, Autumn Allen praised the book's illustrations and remarked that "one could read the pictures without the words and take away the same main messages".

She illustrated the Google Doodle for December 30, 2020, which featured the Tlingit civil rights activist Elizabeth Peratrovich. In 2021, she collaborated with the Canadian author Tasha Spillett-Sumner on I Sang You Down from the Stars, a picture book about an Indigenous mother preparing for her new baby. Goade's next book, Berry Song, is scheduled for publication in mid-2022.

Illustrated works 

 Goade, Michaela (2022). Berry Song. Little, Brown Books for Young Readers. ISBN 978-0-316-49417-5

References

External links 
 

20th-century births
21st-century American artists
21st-century American women artists
American children's book illustrators
American women illustrators
Caldecott Medal winners
Native American illustrators
Haida people
Living people
People from Juneau, Alaska
Tlingit people
21st-century Native American women
21st-century Native Americans
Artists from Alaska